The Works is the sixth album by folk duo Spiers and Boden. It was made to celebrate 10 years working together. It features re-recorded tracks from their previous albums. The album also features a number of special guests.

Track listing
"Tom Padget"
"Horn Fair"
"Gooseberry Bush/Laudanum Bunches"
"The Birth of Robin Hood"
"The Cheshire Waltz"
"Brown Adam"
"Rochdale Coconut Dance"
"Old Maui"
"Haul Away"
"Bold Sir Rylas"
"Prickle-Eye Bush"

Personnel

Limited edition
500 copies of the album have been made to celebrate their 10th anniversary, these have been available to purchase at some concerts on the 2011 Spring tour. The sleeve notes on the album are written by Colin Irwin, it is not known if regular edition will also contain the same ones.

References

Spiers and Boden albums
2011 albums